The Malayan porcupine or Himalayan porcupine (Hystrix brachyura) is a species of rodent in the family Hystricidae. Three subspecies are extant in South and Southeast Asia.

Geographical distribution
The Malayan porcupine ranges from Nepal through north-east India (Arunachal Pradesh, Sikkim, West Bengal, Manipur, Mizoram, Meghalaya and Nagaland), to Bangladesh, central and southern China (Xizang, Hainan, Yunnan, Sichuan, Chongqing, Guizhou, Hunnan, Guangxi, Guangdong, Hong Kong, Fujian, Jianxi, Zhejiang, Shanghai, Jiangsu, Anhui, Henan, Hubei, Shaanxi, Gansu), throughout Myanmar, Thailand, Laos, Cambodia and Vietnam, through Peninsular Malaysia, to Singapore, Sumatra (Indonesia) and throughout Borneo (Indonesia, Malaysia, Sarawak and Brunei). It is also present on the island of Penang, Malaysia. It can be found from sea level to at least 1,300 m asl.

Evolution
This species and their close relatives are believed, based on their current distribution, to have originated in southern Asia. They likely have a common ancestor from the Late Pleistocene when Sumatra, Borneo, and Palawan were part of Sundaland.

Habitat and ecology
Malayan porcupines are terrestrial and usually to be found in small groups in various types of forest habitats, as well as open areas near forests: they may also stray into nearby agricultural areas. They often inhabit dens they have found near rocky areas or in the holes of trees or root systems. They may also dig out and live in burrows, from which a network of trails penetrate into surrounding habitat. They can be found in all forest types up to 1500 m altitude.

Female porcupines have a gestation period of 110 days and a litter size of two or three. The species may give birth to two litters annually.

Characteristics
It is a large and stout-bodied rodent covered with quills which are sharp, rigid structures. The quills are modified hair. Those on their upper body parts are rough with black with white or yellow stripes. The young's soft quills become hard as they enter adulthood. They have short, stocky legs covered in brown hairs which have four claws on the front and five on the hind legs. Both front and hind legs have smooth soles. The head and body measurement are around 56-74 cm and the tail is about 6–11 cm. They weigh around 10 kg-18 kg.

Diet
They normally feed on roots, tubers, bark and fallen fruits. They also eat carrion, insects, and large tropical seeds such as belonging to Chisocheton cumingianus.

Behaviour
H. brachyura forages at night and rests during the day. It may be found singly or in pairs. It can also swim and gnaw. The sow usually delivers a single pup at a time, but delivering two pups has also been recorded. The gestation period is about 90 to 112 days. Their maximum longevity is about 27 years.

Conservation and economic importance
IUCN has categorized this species as Least Concern. The quills of the Malayan porcupine are used for ornamental purposes. Porcupines are also hunted for meat and traditional medicines.

Gallery

References

Sources
 I Dahlan,AA Salam,BS Amin,A Osman. (1995). Preference and Intake of Feedstuff by Crested Porcupines(Hystrix Brachyura) in Captivity. Ann Zootech 44, 271.
 Vaughan, T. A. (1985). Family Hystricidae. In T. A. Vaughan, Mammalogy Third Edition (pp. 266–267). Arizona: Saunders College Publishing.

Hystrix (mammal)
Rodents of India
Rodents of Bangladesh
Mammals described in 1758
Taxa named by Carl Linnaeus
Rodents of Malaysia
Mammals of Borneo
Rodents of Indonesia
Rodents of Myanmar
Rodents of Thailand
Rodents of Laos
Rodents of Cambodia
Rodents of Vietnam
Mammals of Brunei
Rodents of Singapore
Rodents of China
Mammals of India
Mammals of Nepal
Articles containing video clips
Taxonomy articles created by Polbot